Jose Antonio Dominguez Alvarez is a Panamanian politician who served as minister of public works, deputy, and national assembly legislator. He is the son of the former businessman and politician, Antonio Dominguez.

Politics 
Jose Antonio Dominguez started his career as a civil engineer who later went on to work as an advisor to the minister of public works. He later became minister of public works from 1993 until 1994. In 1999, Mireya Moscoso appointed him to the post of ambassador and consul to Taiwan. In 2013, Dominguez ran for president of the Panameñista Party but lost against the former vice president and president of the Republic of Panama, Juan Carlos Varela. In 2014, Dominguez ran for deputy for district 8-6. He was elected to the position and served in the post until 2019 when he lost reelection. During his tenure as deputy, he had strong opposition to what his party was doing due to mismanagement and corruption in the government.

References 

1960 births
Living people
Members of the National Assembly (Panama)
Panameñista Party politicians